The New Hampshire Wildcats women's basketball team is the basketball team that represent the University of New Hampshire in Durham, New Hampshire. The school's team currently competes in the America East Conference and plays its home games at Lundholm Gym.

History
The Wildcats won back-to-back Eastern College Athletic Conference conference titles in 1983 and 1984 but they were not invited to the NCAA Tournament. The Wildcats have never won the America East Conference Tournament, but they have made the Semifinals in 2013, 2014, and 2017. They won the regular season title in the latter year, which earned them a bid to the 2017 Women's National Invitation Tournament, their first ever postseason appearance. They lost 69–56 to Hartford in the First Round.

Season-by-season record
Source:

{| class="wikitable"
|- align="center"

Postseason

WNIT results

WBI results

References

External links